This article gives a list of all species of fish found in the waters of Ireland. A separate list of freshwater fish is given at the bottom.

Class Myxini (hagfish)

Order Myxiniformes

Family Myxinidae

Atlantic hagfish, Myxine glutinosa 
White-headed hagfish, Myxine ios

Hyperoartia

Order Petromyzontiformes (lampreys)

Family Petromyzontidae 
European river lamprey, Lampetra fluviatilis 
European brook lamprey, Lampetra planeri 
Sea lamprey, Petromyzon marinus

Infraphylum Gnathostomata (jawed vertebrates)

Class Chondrichthyes (cartilaginous fish)

Subclass Elasmobranchii

Superorder Selachimorpha (sharks and dogfish)

Order Squatiniformes (angelsharks)

Family Squatinidae (angelsharks)
Angel shark, Squatina squatina

Order Squaliformes (dogfishes and relatives)

Family Centrophoridae (gulper sharks)
Leafscale gulper shark, Centrophorus squamosus 
Birdbeak dogfish, Deania calcea 
Family Dalatiidae
Kitefin shark, Dalatias licha 
Family Echinorhinidae (bramble and prickly sharks
Bramble shark, Echininorhinus brucus 
Family Etmopteridae (lantern sharks)
Black dogfish, Centroscyllium fabricii 
Velvet belly lantern shark, Etmopterus spinax 
Great lanternshark, Etmopterus princeps 
Family Oxynotidae (rough sharks)
Sailfin roughshark, Oxynotus paradoxus 
Family Somniosidae (sleeper sharks)
Portuguese dogfish, Centroscymnus coelolepis 
Longnose velvet dogfish, Centroselachus crepidater 
Smallmouth velvet dogfish, Scymnodon obscurus 
Knifetooth dogfish, Scymnodon ringens 
Greenland shark, Somniosus microcephalus 
Family Squalidae (spiny dogfishes)
Spiny dogfish, Squalus acanthias

Order Hexanchiformes (frilled and cow sharks)

Family Chlamydoselachidae (frilled sharks)
Frilled Shark, Chlamydoselachus anguineus 

Family Hexanchidae (sixgill sharks)
Bluntnose sixgill shark, Hexanchus griseus

Order Carcharhiniformes (ground sharks)

Family Carcharhinidae (requiem sharks)
Blue shark, Prionace glauca 
Family Scyliorhinidae (catsharks)
Iceland catshark, Apristurus laurussonii 
Ghost catshark, Apristurus manis 
Black roughscale catshark, Apristurus melanoasper 
Blackmouth catshark, Galeus melastomus 
Lesser spotted dogfish, Scyliorhinus canicula 
Nursehound, Scyliorhinus stellaris 
Family Sphyrnidae (hammerhead sharks)
Smooth hammerhead, Sphyrna zygaena 
Family Triakidae (houndsharks)
Tope, Galeorhinus galeus 
Starry smooth-hound, Mustelus asterias

Order Lamniformes (mackerel sharks)

Family Alopiidae (thresher sharks)
Common thresher, Alopias vulpinus 
Family Cetorhinidae (basking sharks)
Basking shark, Cetorhinus maximus 

Family Lamnidae (mackerel sharks)
Porbeagle, Lamna nasus 
Shortfin mako shark, Isurus oxyrinchus

Superorder Batoidea (rays, skates and sawfishes)

Order Torpediniformes (electric rays)

Atlantic torpedo, Tetronarce nobiliana 
Spotted torpedo, Torpedo marmorata

Order Myliobatiformes (rays)

Family Dasyatidae (whiptail stingrays)
Common stingray, Dasyatis pastinaca 
Pelagic stingray, Pteroplatytrygon violacea 
Family Myliobatidae (eagle rays)
Common eagle ray, Myliobatis aquila 
Family Mobulidae (devil rays)
Devil fish, Mobula mobular

Order Rajiformes (skates)

Family Rajidae (skates)
Thorny skate, Amblyraja radiata 
Blue skate, Dipturus batis 
Norwegian skate, Dipturus nidarosiensis 
Long-nosed skate, Dipturus oxyrinchus 
Sandy ray, Leucoraja circularis 
Blue ray, Neoraja caerulea 
Blonde ray, Raja brachyura 
Thornback ray, Raja clavata 
Shagreen ray, Raja fullonica 
Small-eyed ray, Raja microocellata 
Spotted ray, Raja montagui 
Cuckoo ray, Raja naevus
Undulate ray, Raja undulata
Deepwater ray, Rajella bathyphila
Bigelow's ray, Rajella bigelowi
Round ray, Rajella fyllae
Bottlenosed skate, Rostroraja alba

Subclass Holocephali

Order Chimaeriformes (chimaeras)

Family Rhinochimaeridae (longnose chimaeras)
Narrownose chimaera, Harriotta raleighana
Broadnose chimaera, Rhinochimaera atlantica
Family Chimaeridae (shortnose chimaeras)
Rabbit fish, Chimaera monstrosa
Opal chimaera, Chimaera opalescens
Smalleyed rabbitfish, Hydrolagus affinis
Large-eyed rabbitfish, Hydrolagus mirabilis

Superclass Osteichthyes (boned fish) - Class Actinopterygii (ray-finned fish)

Subclass Chondrostei

Order Acipenseriformes (sturgeons)
Family Acipenseridae (sturgeons)
European sea sturgeon, Acipenser sturio

Subclass Neopterygii

Infraclass Holostei

Superorder Clupeomorpha

Order Clupeiformes (herring and anchovies)

Family Clupeidae (herring and sardines)
Allis shad, Alosa alosa
Twaite shad, Alosa fallax
Atlantic herring, Clupea harengus
Pilchard, Sardina pilchardus
European sprat, Sprattus sprattus sprattus
Family Engraulidae (Anchovies)
European anchovy, Engraulis encrasicolus

Superorder Elopomorpha

Order Anguilliformes (true eels)

Family Anguillidae (freshwater eels)
European eel, Anguilla anguilla
Family Congridae (conger eels)
European conger, Conger conger
Family Muraenidae (moray eels)
Mediterranean moray, Muraena helena
Family Nettastomatidae (duckbill eels)
Whipsnout sorcerer, Venefica proboscidea
Family Synaphobranchidae (cutthroat eels)
Deepwater arrowtooth eel, Histiobranchus bathybius
Ilyophis arx
Ilyophis blachei
Muddy arrowtooth eel, Ilyophis brunneus
Kaup's arrowtooth eel, Synaphobranchus kaupii

Order Notacanthiformes (halosaurs, spiny eels)
Family Halosauridae (halosaurs)	
Abyssal halosaur, Halosauropsis macrochir
Sahara halosaur, Halosaurus johnsonianus
Family Notacanthidae (spiny eels)
Shortfin spiny eel, Notacanthus bonaparte
Snub-nosed spiny eel, Notacanthus chemnitzii
Longnose tapirfish, Polyacanthonotus challengeri
Smallmouth spiny eel, Polyacanthonotus rissoanus

Order Saccopharyngiformes (gulper eels)
Family Eurypharyngidae (pelican eels)
Pelican eel, Eurypharynx pelecanoides
Family Saccopharyngidae (gulper eels)
Gulper eel, Saccopharynx ampullaceus

Superorder Ostariophysi

Order Cypriniformes

Family Cyprinidae (carp and relatives)
Common bream, Abramis brama
Gudgeon, Gobio gobio
Common dace, Leuciscus leuciscus
Common minnow, Phoxinus phoxinus
Common roach, Rutilus rutilus
Common rudd, Scardinius erythrophthalmus
European chub, Squalius cephalus
Tench, Tinca tinca
Family Nemacheilidae (stone loaches)
Stone loach,  Barbatula barbatula

Superorder Protacanthopterygii

Order Alepocephaliformes

Family Platytroctidae (tubeshoulders)
Bighead searsid, Holtbyrnia anomala
Maul's searsid, Maulisia mauli
Multipore searsid, Normichthys operosus
Schnakenbeck's searsid, Sagamichthys schnakenbecki
Koefoed's searsid, Searsia koefoedi
Family Alepocephalidae (slickheads)
Longfin smooth-head, Conocara macropterum
Elongate smooth-head, Conocara microlepis
Murray's smooth-head, Conocara murrayi
Salmon smooth-head, Conocara salmoneum
Agassiz' smooth-head, Leptochilichthys agassizii
Blackhead salmon, Narcetes stomias
Abyssal smooth-head, Rinoctes nasutus
Softskin smooth-head, Rouleina attrita
Bluntsnout smooth-head, Xenodermichthys copei

Order Argentiniformes

Family Microstomatidae (pencil smelts)
Slender argentine, Microstoma microstoma
Greenland argentine, Nansenia groenlandica
Nansenia oblita
Family Opisthoproctidae (barreleyes)
Barrel-eye, Opisthoproctus soleatus

Order Osmeriformes (smelts, etc.)

European smelt, Osmerus eperlanus

Order Salmoniformes (salmon, trout, whitefish)

Family Salmonidae (salmon, trout, whitefish)
Irish pollan, Coregonus autumnalis
Common whitefish, Coregonus lavaretus
Atlantic salmon, Salmo salar
Brown trout, Salmo trutta
Sea trout, Salmo trutta trutta
Arctic char, Salvelinus alpinus alpinus
Cole's char, Salvelinus colii
Coomsaharn char, Salvelinus fimbriatus
Gray's char, Salvelinus grayi
Blunt-snouted Irish char, Salvelinus obtusus

Superorder Stenopterygii

Order Stomiiformes

Family Gonostomatidae (bristlemouths)
Longray fangjaw, Bonapartia pedaliota
Bristlemouth, Cyclothone alba
Spark anglemouth, Sigmops bathyphilus
Family Sternoptychidae (hatchefishes and relatives)
Mueller's pearlside, Maurolicus muelleri
Diaphanous hatchetfish, Sternoptyx diaphana
Constellationfish, Valenciennellus tripunctulatus
Family Phosichthyidae (lightfishes)
Rendezvous fish, Polymetme corythaeola
Polymetme thaeocoryla
Family Stomiidae (dragonfishes)
Large-eye snaggletooth, Borostomias antarcticus
Grammatostomias flagellibarba
Leptostomias gladiator
Boa dragonfish, Stomias boa ferox
Threelight dragonfish, Trigonolampa miriceps

Superorder Cyclosquamata

Order Aulopiformes (grinners, lizardfishes)

Family Notosudidae (waryfishes)
Blackfin waryfish, Scopelosaurus lepidus
Family Paralepididae (barracudinas)
Duckbill barracudina, Magnisudis atlantica
Sharpchin barracudina, Paralepis coregonoides
Sudis hyalina

Superorder Scopelomorpha

Order Myctophiformes (lanternfishes)

Family Myctophidae (lanternfishes)
Glacier lanternfish, Benthosema glaciale
Spothead lantern fish, Diaphus metopoclampus
White-spotted lantern fish, Diaphus rafinesquii
Chubby flashlightfish, Electrona risso
Spotted lanternfish, Myctophum punctatum
Topside lampfish, Notolychnus valdiviae
Diamondcheek lanternfish, Lampanyctus intricarius
Rakery beaconlamp, Lampanyctus macdonaldi
Cocco's lantern fish, Lobianchia gemellarii
Arctic telescope, Protomyctophum arcticum
Large scale lantern fish, Symbolophorus veranyi

Acanthomorpha

Order Lampriformes

Family Lampridae (opahs)
Opah, Lampris guttatus
Family Trachipteridae (ribbonfishes)
Dealfish, Trachipterus arcticus

Order Zeiformes (dories, etc.)

Family Zeidae (dories)
John Dory, Zeus faber

Family Oreosomatidae (oreos)
False boarfish, Neocyttus helgae

Order Gadiformes (cod and relatives)

Family Gadidae (cod and relatives)
Silvery cod, Gadiculus argenteus argenteus
Silvery pout, Gadiculus argenteus thori
Atlantic cod, Gadus morhua
Haddock, Melanogrammus aeglefinus
Whiting, Marlangius merlangus
Blue whiting, Micromesistius poutassou
Pollock, Pollachius pollachus

Saithe, Pollachius virens
Tadpole fish, Raniceps raninus
Norway pout, Trisopterus esmarkii
Pouting, Trisopterus luscus
Poor cod, Trisopterus minutus
Family Lotidae (lings)
Cusk, Brosme brosme
Fivebeard rockling, Ciliata mustela
Northern rockling, Ciliata septentrionalis
Fourbeard rockling, Enchelyopus cimbrius
Arctic rockling, Gaidropsarus argentatus
Bigeye rockling, Gaidropsarus macrophthalmus
Shore rockling, Gaidropsarus mediterraneus
Three-bearded rockling, Gaidropsarus vulgaris
Burbot, Lota lota
Blue ling, Molva dypterygia
Spanish ling, Molva macrophthalma
Common ling, Molva molva
Family Macrouridae (grenadiers or rattails)
Hollowsnout grenadier, Coelorinchus caelorhincus
Spearsnouted grenadier, Coelorinchus labiatus
Abyssal grenadier, Coryphaenoides armatus
Coryphaenoides brevibarbis
Carapine grenadier, Coryphaenoides carapinus
Günther's grenadier, Coryphaenoides guentheri
Ghostly grenadier, Coryphaenoides leptolepis
Mediterranean grenadier, Coryphaenoides mediterraneus
Deepwater grenadier, Coryphaenoides profundicolus
Roundnose grenadier, Coryphaenoides rupestris
Glasshead grenadier, Hymenocephalus italicus

Onion-eye grenadier, Macrourus berglax
Softhead grenadier, Malacocephalus laevis
Common Atlantic grenadier, Nezumia aequalis
Paracetonurus flagellicauda
Family Merlucciidae (hakes)
Lyconus brachycolus
European hake, Merluccius merluccius
Family Moridae (codlings)
Common mora, Mora moro
Guttigadus latifrons
Slender codling, Halargyreus johnsonii
North Atlantic codling, Lepidion eques
Family Phycidae (forkbeard hakes)
Greater forkbeard, Phycis blennoides
Family Trachyrincidae
Roughnose grenadier, Trachyrincus murrayi
Roughsnout grenadier, Trachyrincus scabrus

Superorder Acanthopterygii

Order Beryciformes (alfonsinos, bigscales, ridgeheads)
Family Berycidae (alfonsinos)
Alfonsino, Beryx decadactylus
Family Melamphaidae (bigscales)
Crested bigscale, Poromitra crassiceps
Bean's bigscale, Scopelogadus beanii

Oder Trachichthyiformes (spinyfins, roughies and relatives)
Family Diretmidae (spinyfins)
Silver spinyfin, Diretmus argenteus

Family Trachichthyidae (roughies and slimeheads)
Orange roughy, Hoplostethus atlanticus
Silver roughy, Hoplostethus mediterraneus mediterraneus

Clade Percomorpha

Series Ophidiimorpharia

Order Ophidiiformes (cusk-eels, brotulas and relatives)
Family Aphyonidae
Sciadonus galatheae
Family Bythitidae (viviparous brotulas)
Cataetyx alleni
Cataetyx laticeps
Thalassobathia pelagica
Family Carapidae (pearlfishes)
Pearlfish, Echiodon drummondii
Family Ophidiidae (cusk-eels)
Pudgy cuskeel, Spectrunculus grandis

Series Gobiomorpharia

Order Gobiiformes (gobies and relatives)

Family Gobiidae (gobies)
Transparent goby, Aphia minuta
Jeffrey's goby, Buenia jeffreysii
Crystal goby, Crystallogobius linearis
Couch's goby, Gobius couchi
Red-mouthed goby, Gobius cruentatus
Black goby, Gobius niger
Rock goby, Gobius paganellus
Two-spotted goby, Gobiusculus flavescens
Lesueurigobius friesii
Lozano's goby, Pomatoschistus lozanoi
Common goby, Pomatoschistus microps
Sand gobyPomatoschistus minutus
Painted goby, Pomatoschistus pictus
Leopard-spotted goby, Thorogobius ephippiatus

Series Scombrimorpharia

Order Syngnathiformes (pipefishes, seahorses, dragonettes and relatives)

Family Callionymidae (dragonettes)
Common dragonet, Callionymus lyra
Callionymus maculatus
Reticulated dragonet, Callionymus reticulatus
Family Mullidae (goatfishes)
Red mullet, Mullus barbatus barbatus
Striped red mullet, Mullus surmuletus
Family Syngnathidae (seahorses and pipefishes)
Snake pipefish, Entelurus aequoreus
Long-snouted seahorse, Hippocampus guttulatus
Worm pipefish, Nerophis lumbriciformis
Straightnose pipefish, Nerophis ophidion
Greater pipefish, Syngathus acus
Nilsson's pipefish, Syngnathus rostellatus
Broad-nosed pipefish, Syngnathus typhle

Order Scombriformes (tuna, mackerel and relatives; sensu Betancur-Rodriguez et al. 2016)

Family Bramidae (pomfrets)
Atlantic pomfret, Brama brama
Bigscale pomfret, Taractichthys longipinnis
Family Centrolophidae (medusafishes)
Barrelfish, Hyperoglyphe perciformis
Cornish blackfish, Schedophilus medusophagus
Family Gempylidae (snake mackerels)
Black gemfish, Nesiarchus nasutus
Oilfish, Ruvettus pretiosus
Family Nomeidae (driftfishes)
Family Scombridae (tuna, mackerel and bonitos)
Bullet tuna, Auxis rochei rochei 	
Frigate tuna, Auxis thazard thazard
Skipjack tuna, Katsuwonus pelamis
Atlantic bonito, Sarda sarda
Atlantic mackerel, Scomber scombrus
Albacore, Thunnus alalunga
Atlantic bluefin tuna, Thunnus thynnus
Family Trichiuridae (cutlassfishes and scabbardfishes)
Black scabbardfish, Aphanopus carbo
Silver scabbardfish, Lepidopus caudatus
Largehead hairtail, Trichiurus lepturus

Series Carangimorpharia

Order Istiophoriformes (billfishes)

Family Xiphiidae (swordfish)
Swordfish, Xiphias gladius

Order Carangiformes (jacks and relatives)

Family Carangidae (jacks and relatives)
Vadigo, Campogramma glaycos
Derbio, Trachinotus ovatus
Atlantic horse mackerel, Trachurus trachurus

Order Pleuronectiformes (flatfishes)

Family Pleuronectidae (righteye flounders)
American plaice, Hippoglossoides platessoides
Atlantic halibut, Hippoglossus hippoglossus
Torbay sole, Glyptocephalus cynoglossus
Dab, Limanda limanda
Lemon sole, Microstomus kitt
European flounder, Platichthys flesus
European plaice, Pleuronectes platessa
 
Greenland halibut, Reinhardtius hippoglossoides
Family Scophthalmidae (turbots)
Fourspotted megrim, Lepidorhombus boscii
Megrim, Lepidorhombus whiffiagonis
Norwegian topknot, Phrynorhombus norvegicus
Turbot, Scophthalmus maximus
Brill, Scophthalmus rhombus
Topknot, Zeugopterus punctatus
Eckström's topknot, Zeugopterus regius
Family Soleidae (true soles)
Solenette, Buglossidium luteum
Thickback sole, Microchirus variegatus
Common sole, Solea solea

Order Beloniformes

Family Belonidae (needlefishes)
Garfish, Belone belone
Short-beaked garfish, Belone svetovidovi
Family Scomberesocidae (sauries)
Atlantic saury, Scomberesox saurus saurus

Order Atheriniformes (silversides)

Family Atherinidae (silversides)
Sand smelt, Atherina presbyter

Order Mugiliformes (mullets)

Family Mugilidae (mullets)
Thicklip grey mullet, Chelon labrosus
Golden grey mullet, Chelon aurata
Thin-lipped grey mullet, Chelon ramada

Order Gobiesociformes (clingfishes)

Family Gobiesocidae (clingfishes)
Two-spotted clingfish, Diplecogaster bimaculata
Connemarra clingfish, Lepadogaster candolii

Order Blenniiformes (blennies and relatives)

Family Blenniidae (combtooth blennies)
Montagu's blenny, Coryphoblennius galerita
Shanny, Lipophrys pholis
Tompot blenny, Parablennius gattorugine

Order Uranoscopiformes (weevers, stargazers and relatives; sensu Betancur-Rodriguez et al. 2016)

Family Ammodytidae (sandlances)
Raitt's sand eel, Ammodytes marinus 	 	
Lesser sand eel, Ammodytes tobianus
Smooth sandeel, Gymnammodytes semisquamatus
Great sand eel, Hyperoplus immaculatus
Great sandeel, Hyperoplus lanceolatus
Family Trachinidae (weeverfishes)
Lesser weever, Echiichthys vipera
Greater weever, Trachinus draco
Family Uranoscopidae (stargazers)
Atlantic stargazer, Uranoscopus scaber

Order Labriformes (wrasses sensu Betancur-Rodriguez et al. 2016)

Family Labridae (wrasses)
Rock cook, Centrolabrus exoletus
Goldsinny wrasse, Ctenolabrus rupestris
Ballan wrasse, Labrus bergylta
Cuckoo wrasse, Labrus mixtus
Baillon's wrasse, Symphodus bailloni
Corkwing wrasse, Symphodus melops

Order Pempheriformes (sensu Betancur-Rodriguez et al. 2016)

Family Epigonidae (deepwater cardinalfishes)
Bulls-eye, Epigonus telescopus
Family Polyprionidae (wreckfishes)
Atlantic wreckfish, Polyprion americanus

Order Perciformes (sensu Betancur-Rodriguez et al. 2016)

Suborder Percoidei (sensu Betancur-Rodriguez et al. 2016)

Family Percidae (perches)
European perch, Perca fluviatilis

Suborder Triglioidei (searobins and gurnards)

Family Triglidae (searobins and gurnards)
Tub gurnard, Chelidonichthys lucerna
Longfin gurnard, Chelidonichthys obscurus
Grey gurnard, Eutrigla gurnardus

Suborder Scorpaenoidei (scorpionfish, rockfishes and relatives)

Family Sebastidae (rockfishes)
Blackbelly rosefish, Helicolenus dactylopterus dactylopterus
Norway redfish, Sebastes viviparus
Spiny scorpionfish, Trachyscorpia cristulata echinata

Suborder Cottoidei (sculpins, eelpouts, sticklebacks and relatives)

Infraorder Zoarcales (eelpouts, wolffishes and relatives)

Family Anarhichadidae (wolffishes)
Atlantic wolffish, Anarhichas lupus
Family Pholidae (gunnels)
Rock gunnel, Pholis gunnellus
Family Stichaeidae (pricklebacks)
Yarrell's blenny, Chirolophis ascanii
Family Zoarcidae (eelpouts)
White eelpout, Lycenchelys alba
Atlantic eelpout, Lycodes terraenovae
Snubnose eelpout, Pachycara bulbiceps
Pachycara crassiceps
Viviparous blenny, Zoarces viviparus

Infraorder Gasterosteales (sticklebacks, etc.)

Family Gasterosteidae (sticklebacks)
Three-spined stickleback, Gasterosteus aculeatus aculeatus
Nine-spined stickleback, Pungitius pungitius
Sea stickleback, Spinachia spinachia

Infraorder Cottales (sculpins, snailfishes, lumpfishes and relatives)

Family Cottidae (sculpins)
European bullhead, Cottus gobio
Norway bullhead, Micrenophrys lilljeborgii
Shorthorn sculpin, Myoxocephalus scorpius
Longspined sea-scorpion, Taurulus bubalis
Family Cyclopteridae (lumpsuckers)
Lumpsucker, Cyclopterus lumpus

Family Liparidae (snailfishes)
 Careproctus aciculipunctatus
Merret's snailfish, Careproctus merretti
Common seasnail, Liparis liparis liparis
Montagu's sea snail, Liparis montagui
Paraliparis abyssorum
Black seasnail, Paraliparis bathybius
Paraliparis bipolaris
Paraliparis hystrix
Family Psychrolutidae (fatheads and blobfishes)
Pallid sculpin, Cottunculus thomsonii

Order Moroniformes (temperate basses sensu Betancur-Rodriguez et al. 2016)

Family Moronidae (temperate basses)
European seabass, Dicentrarchus labrax

Order Spariformes (seabreams and relatives sensu Betancur-Rodriguez et al. 2016)

Family Sparidae (seabreams and progies)
Bogue, Boops boops
Common dentex, Dentex dentex
Blackspot seabream, Pagellus bogaraveo
Common pandora, Pagellus erythrinus
Gilt-head bream, Sparus aurata
Black seabream, Spondyliosoma cantharus

Order Priacanthiformes (bigeyes and bandfishes sensu Betancur-Rodriguez et al. 2016)

Family Cepolidae (bandfishes)
Red bandfish, Cepola macrophthalma

Order Caproiformes (boarfishes sensu Betancur-Rodriguez et al. 2016)

Family Caproidae (boarfishes)
Boarfish, Capros aper

Order Lophiiformes (anglerfishes)

Suborder Lophoidei (monkfishes)

Family Lophiidae (monkfishes)
Black-bellied angler, Lophius budegassa
Monkfish, Lophius piscatorius

Suborder Ceratioidei

Family Oneirodidae (dreamers)
Can-opener smoothdream, Chaenophryne longiceps
Oneirodes carlsbergi
Bulbous dreamer, Oneirodes eschrichtii

Order Tetraodontiformes (pufferfishes, triggerfishes, molas)

Family Molidae (molas)
Ocean sunfish, Mola mola
Slender sunfish, Ranzania laevis
Family Tetraodontidae (pufferfishes)
Blunthead puffer, Sphoeroides pachygaster

Freshwater fish
It has been argued that only nine species of freshwater fish are truly native to Ireland — five char species, pollan, eel, brown trout and Atlantic salmon — as Ireland's fresh water was entirely frozen during the last glacial period, only diadromous fish could repopulate Irish waters after the Ice Age. All other freshwater species were introduced, mostly from the Middle Ages onwards.

European river lamprey, Lampetra fluviatilis
European brook lamprey, Lampetra planeri
Sea lamprey, Petromyzon marinus
European eel, Anguilla anguilla
Allis shad, Alosa alosa
Twaite shad, Alosa falax fallax
Common dace, Leuciscus leuciscus
Common minnow, Phoxinus phoxinus
Gudgeon, Gobio gobio
Common roach, Rutilus rutilus
Common rudd, Scardinius erythrophthalmus
European chub, Squalius cephalus
Common bream, Abramis brama
Stone loach,  Nemacheilus barbatulus
Tench, Tinca tinca
Northern pike, Esox lucius
European smelt, Osmerus eperlanus
Atlantic salmon, Salmo salar
Arctic char, Salvelinus alpinus alpinus
Cole's char, Salvelinus colii
Coomsaharn char, Salvelinus fimbriatus
Gray's char, Salvelinus grayi
Blunt-snouted Irish char, Salvelinus obtusus 
Brown trout, Salmo trutta
Irish pollan, Coregonus autumnalis
Three-spined stickleback, Gasterosteus aculeatus aculeatus
Nine-spined stickleback, Pungitius pungitius
European bullhead, Cottus gobio
Norway bullhead, Taurulus lilljeborgi

References

FishBase Froese, R. and D. Pauly. Editors. 2018. FishBase. World Wide Web electronic publication. www.fishbase.org, (June 2018)
Irish Natural History Literature Online
Went, A. E. J. (1957). List of Irish Fishes. Department of Lands, Fisheries Division, Dublin. 31 p.
Went, A. E. J. (1973). Supplement to List of Irish Fishes, Irish Fisheries Leaflet, Department of Agriculture and Fisheries (Fisheries Division)
Went, A. E. J. & Kennedy, M. (1976). List of Irish Fishes Stationery Office, Dublin 
Whitehead, P. J. P.; Bauchot, M.-L.; Hureau, J.-C.; Nielsen, J. & Tortonese, E. (eds.) (1986). Fishes of the North-eastern Atlantic and the Mediterranean. UNESCO, Paris. Vols. I-III:1473 p.
Whitehead, P. J. P. (1985). FAO Species Catalogue. Vol. 7. Clupeoid fishes of the world (suborder Clupeoidei). An Annotated and Illustrated Catalogue of the Herrings, Sardines, Pilchards, Sprats, Shads, Anchovies and Wolf-Herrings. FAO Fish. Synop. 125(7/1): 1-303. Rome: FAO.
Quigley, D. T. G. series of papers in Irish Naturalists' Journal and records of rare marine fish species taken in Irish waters by fishing vessels and sea anglers from 1786 to 2008. National Biodiversity Data Centre data set online
Wheeler, A. (1992). A list of the common and scientific names of fishes of the British Isles. Journal of Fish Biology. 41 (Suppl. A). 
Wheeler, A. C.; Merrett, N. R. & Quigley, T. G. (2004). Additional records and notes for Wheeler's (1992) List of the Common and Scientific Names of Fishes of the British Isles Journal of Fish Biology. December 2004

External links 
pdf Peter S. Maitland. Ireland's most threatened and rare freshwater fish: an international perspective on fish conservation
"Aquatic Invasions European Chub".

Ireland
Fish
Fish
Ireland